Handicapped City is an off-Broadway Theatre production written and directed by Indian playwright Sachin Gupta.

Plot
Ruby, the leader of a group of young partygoers, finds out a way to get financial support to take care of disabled people. Except they are not planning to actually take care of them.

Characters 
Ruby
Jamie
Johny
Nicole
Tracy
Trista
Madeline

Off Broadway cast

Duration 

65 Minutes

Past seasons 

2004-2005

 At the Sirifort Auditorium
 At the LTG Auditorium

2006-2007

 At Shri Ram Centre for Performing Arts Auditorium India

2008-2009

 At Soho Playhouse, New York City

References 

 "Handicapped City at Soho Playhouse" Playbill.com
 "Out of the Box", The Tribune
 "A Man with A Dream" The Hindu

External links 

 Chilsag Chillies, Home Page

Indian plays
2004 plays